Collaborative translation is a translation technique that has been created or enabled by modern translation technology where multiple participants can collaborate on the same document simultaneously, generally sharing a computer-assisted translation interface that includes tools for collaboration. 

Collaborative translation should not be confused with crowdsourcing: the two are very different, although the techniques can be used together.

Definitions
Collaborative translation techniques are frequently confused with crowdsourcing techniques, even by managers who work in translation industry. 

Collaborative translation refers to the technique of having multiple translation participants with varying tasks participate simultaneously in a collaborative workspace with shared resources. It is a new technique made possible by cloud computing. The purpose of collaborative translation is to reduce the total time of the translation lifecycle, improve communications, particularly between translator and non-translator participants, and eliminate many management tasks.

Crowdsourcing (in the translation industry) refers to the practice of assigning translation tasks to a group of individuals via a "flexible open call". The purpose of crowdsourcing in the translation industry is to simplify the translation assignment phase of the lifecycle, reduce translation rates, and in some implementations, get translation for free.

For example, a crowdsourced document translation could be accepted by ten individuals in a crowd, each of whom has been assigned a piece of the larger document. Parsing a document, in itself, is not collaborative translation, because there is no real collaboration happening. However, when those ten individuals use collaborative translation technology to work and communicate simultaneously amongst themselves and with other collaborators like subject matter experts, managers, proofreaders, etc., it becomes collaborative translation (that included a crowdsourcing phase).

Relation to cloud computing
Cloud computing revolutionized the translation industry and introduced collaborative translation. Managers, translators, and proofreaders, who previously had traditional CAT tools installed on their desktops, could now login to the same system at the same time, sharing translation memory resources in real-time and collaborating via communication features available in the workspace.

Traditional translation workflows were typically lock-step affairs, where the document first went to A where it was translated, then to B where it was proofread, and maybe to C where a subject matter expert might review it. Questions and answers were typically handled by the translation manager. However, by allowing all the participants to share resources and work simultaneously in a single, cloud-based workspace, the lifecycle was shortened and quality increased. 

Some Translation management systems can split even a single source file into a number of translation bundles. The bundles can be assigned to multiple translators who can all work on their own part of the file at the same time as the translation corrector. Combining simultaneous translation workflows with collaborative translation helps limit the time required to translate high volume publications.

References

Translation
Collaborative software